The 1996 California Golden Bears football team was an American football team that represented the University of California, Berkeley in the Pacific-10 Conference (Pac-10) during the 1996 NCAA Division I-A football season. In their first and only year under head coach Steve Mariucci, the Golden Bears compiled a 6–6 record (3–5 against Pac-10 opponents), finished in a tie for fifth place in the Pac-10, and were outscored by their opponents by a combined score of 407 to 382.

The team's statistical leaders included Pat Barnes with 3,499 passing yards, Brandon Willis with 701 rushing yards, and Bobby Shaw with 888 receiving yards.

Schedule

Roster

References

California
California Golden Bears football seasons
California Golden Bears football